Rayakuduru is a village which comes under Veeravasaram Mandal, West Godavari district, Andhra Pradesh, India.

References

Villages in West Godavari district